Moflag Church is a chapel of the Church of Norway in Lurøy Municipality in Nordland county, Norway. It is located in the island village of Moflaget. It is an annex chapel in the Lurøy parish which is part of the Nord-Helgeland prosti (deanery) in the Diocese of Sør-Hålogaland. The white, wooden chapel was built in a long church style in 1921 using plans drawn up by the architect Harald J. Hansen. The chapel seats about 150 people.

See also
List of churches in Sør-Hålogaland

References

Lurøy
Churches in Nordland
Wooden churches in Norway
20th-century Church of Norway church buildings
Churches completed in 1921
1921 establishments in Norway
Long churches in Norway